Frederic Daniel Riss (March 22, 1910 – August 28, 1970) was an American actor who had a career from 1949 to 1965.

Filmography

References

External links

 

1910 births
1970 deaths
20th-century American male actors
American male film actors